Loozanteen is the eighth album from novelty rock band Barnes & Barnes. It was released through Rhino Entertainment.

Track listing
 "Loozanteen"
 "Fire In The Hole"
 "The Invisible Maniac"
 "What's It Like To Be You"
 "Why Don't You Kill Me Now"
 "Talk Line"
 "Love Is So Noisy"
 "Lovely In Loveland"
 "Half"
 "Homophobic Dream #23"
 "Background Boy"
 "Drinking With The Devil"
 "Peg Leg Sue Got Married"
 "Touch Yourself"
 "Spanking Thru My Hard Times"
 "Wax Your Carrot/The Boogie Man And Dan"
 "I Love To Ride The Bus"
 "I Feel Depressed"

1991 albums
Barnes & Barnes albums
Rhino Records albums
1990s comedy albums